Walter Wenger (20 December 1911 – 14 January 1990) was a Swiss wrestler. He competed in the men's freestyle bantamweight at the 1948 Summer Olympics.

References

External links
 

1911 births
1990 deaths
Swiss male sport wrestlers
Olympic wrestlers of Switzerland
Wrestlers at the 1948 Summer Olympics
Place of birth missing